Spottswood Poles (December 27, 1887 – September 12, 1962) was an American outfielder in baseball's Negro leagues. One of the fastest players of his era, Poles was sometimes referred to as "the black Ty Cobb."

Career
According to Negro leagues historian James Riley, Poles' speed was said to be comparable to that of Cool Papa Bell, a Negro league star of the 1930s generally considered to be the fastest man in the history of organized baseball. Poles was a left-handed batter with a keen eye who hit for a high batting average.

Poles started playing organized Negro ball for the Harrisburg Giants in 1906 and first became a professional for Sol White's Philadelphia Giants in 1909. Poles soon followed White to the New York Lincoln Giants in 1911, where he blossomed into a star; in his first four seasons with the Lincoln Giants, 1911–1914, Poles attained batting averages of .440, .398, .414, and .487 against all levels of competition.

Poles then spent the next few seasons jumping among the New York Lincoln Stars, Brooklyn Royal Giants, and Hilldale Daisies. While with the Daisies, Poles joined the 369th Infantry Regiment (Harlem Hellfighters), a unit attached to the French Army during World War I, earning decorations (five battle stars and a Purple Heart) for his combat experience in France as a sergeant. He returned home and continued a successful baseball career, playing for the Lincoln Giants from 1919 to 1923.

Following his playing career, Poles was hired multiple times to coach the Harrisburg Giants, once in 1928 and again in 1953.

Poles is credited with a lifetime batting average of over .400 in all competitions and hit .319 in four winters in Cuba. A tantalizing aspect of his career is his success against white major league teams; Poles hit .610 against these teams, including three consecutive hits against Hall of Famer Grover Cleveland Alexander. 

After retiring from baseball, Poles first worked as a taxi cab operator and then found employment at Olmsted Air Force Base in Middletown, Pennsylvania, which enabled him to retire and live comfortably until his death at the age of 74. Because of his Army service, he was buried in Arlington National Cemetery.

References

External links

 and Baseball-Reference Black Baseball stats and Seamheads

1887 births
1962 deaths
Baseball outfielders
Philadelphia Giants players
Club Fé players
Lincoln Giants players
Hilldale Club players
Lincoln Stars (baseball) players
American expatriate baseball players in Cuba
Baseball players from Virginia
African Americans in World War I
United States Army personnel of World War I
People from Winchester, Virginia
Burials at Arlington National Cemetery
African-American United States Army personnel